CX 26 SODRE, also known as Radio Uruguay 1050 AM, is a state-owned Uruguayan Spanish-language AM radio station that broadcasts from Montevideo. The station broadcasts primarily talk programming.

Some Radio Uruguay programming is aired on the RNU repeater network outside of Montevideo.

References

External links
 
 Radio Uruguay 1050 AM

Spanish-language radio stations
Radio in Uruguay
Mass media in Montevideo
Radiodifusión Nacional del Uruguay

News and talk radio stations